Hugo Lindenberg (born 25 May 1951) is a South African cricketer. He played in 31 first-class and 16 List A matches for Border from 1986/87 to 1992/93.

See also
 List of Border representative cricketers

References

External links
 

1951 births
Living people
South African cricketers
Border cricketers